Yakutsk Television Tower, also known as RTPC Jakutsk and/or RTPTS Yakutsk, is a steel  lattice television tower in the city of Yakutsk, Russia. 

The Yakutsk TV Tower transmits FM and TV throughout Yakutsk. The Yakutsk Television Tower is the eighth-oldest of the tallest towers in Russia.

At the time of its construction in 1982, the Yakutsk TV Tower was the tallest structure ever built on permafrost.

History
Construction began in 1982 and took several months of construction.

See also
Lattice tower
Television tower
List of tallest towers in the world
Yakutsk
Sakha Republic

References

External links

Yakutsk TV Tower - SkyscraperPage Forum
Yakutsk TV tower by ~ Teammate92 on deviantART
Yakutsk TV Tower - Tower in Yakutsk, Russian Federation :: MBendi.com
Yakutsk TV Tower, Russia :: GeoNames.org

Lattice towers
Yakutsk
Towers in Russia
Towers completed in 1982
Buildings and structures in the Sakha Republic
1982 establishments in the Soviet Union